Ellen Walther (born 26 May 1999) is a Swiss para-snowboarder in the SB-LL1 category.

Life and career 
Walther won the bronze medal in the women's dual banked slalom SB-LL1 event at the 2021 World Para Snow Sports Championships held in Lillehammer, Norway. She also won the bronze medal in the women's snowboard cross SB-LL1 event. Along with Romy Tschopp, Walther won the bronze medal in the women's team event.

References 

1999 births
Living people
Swiss female snowboarders
Sportspeople from Basel-Stadt
21st-century Swiss women